Manda Krishna Madiga (birthname Yellaiah; born 7 July 1965) is an Indian politician and activist fighting for the rights of the Madigas through the Madiga Reservation Porata Samiti.

He added the Madiga surname in 1994.

References

Dalit activists
Dalit leaders
People from Hanamkonda district
Activists from Telangana
1965 births
Living people